Suillellus is a genus of bolete fungi in the family Boletaceae. It was originally described by William Alphonso Murrill in 1909 with Suillellus luridus (originally described as a species of Boletus) as the type species. The genus was later sunk into synonymy with Boletus, but eventually resurrected in 2014, after molecular phylogenetics research demonstrated that Suillellus species comprised a different lineage than Boletus.

References

External links

 
Boletales genera
Taxa named by William Alphonso Murrill